Still Standing is the eleventh studio album by American country pop group Exile. It was released on February 14, 1990, via Arista Records. The album includes the singles "Keep It in the Middle of the Road", "Nobody's Talking" "Yet" and "There You Go".

Track listing

Chart performance

References

1990 albums
Exile (American band) albums
Arista Records artists